Teahupoo is a village on the southwestern coast of the island of Tahiti, French Polynesia, in the southern Pacific Ocean.

It is the site of the annual Billabong Pro Tahiti surf competition, part of the World Championship Tour (WCT) of the Association of Surfing Professionals World Tour surfing circuit, and used to be one stop in the World Tour of the International Bodyboarding Association.
Tahitian Thierry Vernaudon and a few other locals surfed Teahupo’o for the very first time in 1985. Bodyboarding pioneers Mike Stewart and Ben Severson showcased the spot in 1986 and it soon became an underground spot for thrill-seeking bodyboarders. Few professional surfers rode Teahupo'o during the early 1990s and it was only in 1998, at the Gotcha Tahiti Pro, that Teahupo'o became widely recognized as having some of the heaviest waves in the world. On August 17, 2000 Laird Hamilton is credited with surfing the "heaviest wave" ever ridden, documented in the film Riding Giants. In 2003 the late Malik Joyeux successfully rode one of the largest waves ever ridden.

Nathan Florence, younger brother of two-time World Surf League champion John John Florence, caught in May 2015 what some have considered to have been the biggest wave ever successfully paddled in Teahupo'o.  Keala Kennelly was the first woman to tow-surf Teahupo'o in May 2005, getting a 10-foot barrel ahead of the Billabong Tahiti Pro contest. This challenging break has been conquered by many top windsurfers, including Jason Polakow, Ali Neil and Levi Siver. Yannick Salmon was the first kitesurfer to ride Teahupo'o; however, it was incorrectly written in publications that others had ridden it before him. Jeremie Eloy and Julien Sudrat kitesurfed the wave after Yannick.

Wave characteristics
Teahupo'o is a pillow break. The swells mainly break backwards, but the outer reef also creates left breaks that surfers must be cautious of when paddling out. Teahupo'o is renowned for the consistent number of barrels it delivers. It is a rewarding location and is widely regarded as being on the 'must-surf' list of every enthusiastic surfer. However, only experienced surfers in peak physical condition should attempt Teahupo'o; heavy waves combined with a shallow pillow can result in serious rest and even swimming in a wipeout.

Teahupo'o's reputation for wave riding is partly due to its unique form. An extremely shallow coral reef, which ranges up to 20 inches (51 cm) beneath the water's surface, is responsible for a very hollow-breaking wave. The wave's unique shape, with an effect of almost breaking below sea level, is due to the specific shape of the reef beneath the wave. Its semi circular nature, which drops down sharply creates a 'below water' effect and the extreme angles in descent create an instant instability to the wave. A steep wall of reef causes the entire mass to fold onto a scalloped semi circle breaking arc. The wave bends and races along into a dry reef closeout and the lip of the wave is often as thick as it is tall.

Surfing deaths at Teahupo'o
Teahupo'o was included on Transworld Surf's list of the 'Top 10 Deadliest Waves' and is commonly referred to as the "heaviest wave in the world". The name 'Teahupo'o' loosely translates to English as “to sever the head” or "place of skulls".

There has been one recorded surfing death at Teahupo'o since 2000: Tahitian surfer Brice Taerea who was killed at Teahupo'o in 2000, just one week before the annual Teahupo'o WCT event. Taerea attempted to duck-dive a dangerous 12-foot (3.7-meter) wave but was thrown over the falls, and landed head first on the reef. He was recovered from the water, but died later in hospital, having suffered two broken cervical vertebra and a severed spinal cord, which resulted in paralysis from the neck down.

Teahupo'o WSL Championship Tour Event Champions

Billabong Pro Teahupoo
1999 - Mark Occhilupo
2000 - Kelly Slater
2001 - Cory Lopez
2002 - Andy Irons
2003 - Kelly Slater
2004 - C.J. Hobgood
2005 - Kelly Slater
2006 - Bobby Martinez
2007 - Damien Hobgood
2008 - Bruno Santos
2009 - Bobby Martinez
2010 - Andy Irons
2011 - Kelly Slater
2012 - Mick Fanning
2013 - Adrian Buchan
2014 - Gabriel Medina
2015 - Jeremy Flores
2016 - Kelly Slater
2017 - Julian Wilson
2018 - Gabriel Medina
2019 - Owen Wright 
2022 -  Miguel Pupo

Olympic venue 
Teahupo'o is scheduled to host the surfing competition for the 2024 Summer Olympics, being hosted in Paris. At , this will break the record for the longest distance between an Olympic medal competition venue and the host city.

See also

Big wave surfing

References

External links

Exact location on the satellite imagery of Bloosee
Teahupo'o November 2, 2007 photos including photo used above.
Teahupo'o surf spot including GPS location and map, pictures, surfs sessions...
 Ujusansa photo story of Laird Hamilton riding The Wave at Teahupo'o, 17 August 2000
Set of 122 photographs of breaks and a variety of riders at Teahupo'o, by Tim McKenna 
Teahupo'o view from Tahiti Photogallery
Photo gallery showing kitesurfing on Teahupo'o
Tahiti Time: Inside a unique view of small wave surfing at Teahupo'o
2009 Billabong Pro Teahupo'o Coverage
Post 2009 Billabong Pro Teahupo'o Photo Gallery

Beaches of Tahiti
Big wave surfing
Olympic surfing venues
Towns and villages in Tahiti
Tow-in surfing
Venues of the 2024 Summer Olympics
Surfing in French Polynesia